Sir John Smith Samuel  KBE FRSE DL (1870–1934) was an early 20th century Scottish master of ceremonies, acting as Ceremonial Secretary to the City of Glasgow and as Private Secretary to the Lord Provost of Glasgow.

Life

He was born on 2 April 1870.

In 1902 he was elected a Fellow of the Royal Society of Edinburgh. His proposers were Magnus Maclean, John Glaister,  James Dalrymple Duncan Dalrymple and John Horne.

From 1903 he served as Secretary to John Ure Primrose. At that time he lived at 8 Park Avenue.

He then consecutively served Sir William Bilsland, Sir Archibald McInnes Shaw, Daniel Macaulay Stevenson, Sir Thomas Dunlop, Sir James Stewart, Sir Thomas Paxton, Sir David Mason and Sir Thomas Kelly.

He died in a nursing home in Glasgow on 10 November 1934 following a brief spell of influenza.

References

1870 births
1934 deaths
Fellows of the Royal Society of Edinburgh